Super Sidekicks 3: The Next Glory is a 1995 soccer arcade video game developed and published by SNK. It is the third installment in the Super Sidekicks series, preceding the original Super Sidekicks 2: The World Championship (1994). Featuring an arcade-style approach to soccer like its predecessors, the game allows players to choose any of the available game modes to compete with AI-controlled rivals or other human players with their preferred team. Though first launched for the MVS hardware, the title was ported for Neo Geo AES and Neo Geo CD, in addition of being re-released through compilations and download services for various consoles. It proved popular among players and garnered positive reception from critics, however most reviewers noted that it felt as an update than a true successor to Super Sidekicks 2. It was followed by The Ultimate 11: SNK Football Championship in 1996.

Gameplay 

Like its predecessor, Super Sidekicks 3: The Next Glory is a soccer game that is played from a top-down perspective in a two-dimensional environment with sprites. Though it follows the same gameplay as with other soccer titles at the time and most of the sport's rules are present, the game opts for a more arcade-styled approach of the sport instead of being full simulation. New features in this game include naming the player scoring goals for his team and keeping score of how many goals he scores during his team's use by the player. Alongside the "Top Teams" ranking which serves as a high score table for teams, there is a "Top Scorer" table for individual players. The name and use of scoring players is random.

The second new feature include regional tournaments, in which a team (from any region) can enter a tournament within its own region or other regions. This is good for those players who like a particular team but don't want to be facing the same opponents every time, as they would if they played the World tournament. Championships include World Tournament (based on the real-life FIFA World Cup), Europe Tournament (UEFA European Football Championship), South America Tournament (Copa América), Americas Tournament (CONCACAF Gold Cup), Africa Tournament (African Cup of Nations), and Asia Tournament (AFC Asian Cup).

Teams 
There are 64 teams available to choose from before the start of any mode, each one divided into 8 geographical "regions" and representing their country:

Development and release 
Super Sidekicks 3: The Next Glory was co-headed by director H. Kawano and producer Eikichi Kawasaki, who was involved in the two previous Super Sidekicks entries. A member under the pseudonym "Uzumasa Seven" worked as main programmer, with "Kanimaro" and "Perfomaru" acting as designers. Shinsekai Gakkyoku Zatsugidan members Akihiro "Ackey" Uchida and Pearl Shibakichi handled the sound design. Other members collaborated in its development. Super Sidekicks 3 was first released by SNK for the Neo Geo MVS in Japan on March 6, 1995, and North America in April, and later for Neo Geo AES in April 7, 1995. It was also showcased by SNK during the 1995 ACME show. The game was later re-released for the Neo Geo CD in Japan on June 23, 1995 and North America in October 1996. In 2008, it was included as part of SNK Arcade Classics Vol. 1 for Wii, PlayStation 2 and PlayStation Portable. In 2013, it was also included as part of the Volume 2 game card for Neo Geo X. Hamster Corporation re-released the title for Nintendo Switch, PlayStation 4 and Xbox One in June 2018 under their Arcade Archives series.

Remake 

In 1998, a remake titled Neo Geo Cup '98: The Road to the Victory was developed and released by SNK for Neo Geo MVS to coincide with the FIFA World Cup 1998, serving as the final entry in the Super Sidekicks series due to the failure of the fourth entry. A Neo Geo Pocket Color was released under the name Neo Geo Cup '98 Plus Color.

Reception 

Super Sidekicks 3: The Next Glory proved popular among players and received positive reception from critics, however most reviewers felt that the game was a mere update rather than a true sequel to Super Sidekicks 2, with some regarding it as inferior to the previous release. In Japan,  listed Super Sidekicks 3 on their April 15, 1995 issue as being the tenth most-popular arcade game at the time. In North America, RePlay reported it was the ninth most-popular arcade game at the time. Electronic Gaming Monthlys two sports reviewers praised the Neo Geo AES version for its graphics, sound, and particularly the easy playability. Andreas Knauf of  commended the visual and sound designs, stating that the title was an updated version of "an excellent soccer game". Stefan Hellert of  similarly commended the graphics and sound but felt that the title was almost the same as the second Super Sidekicks. Likewise, Ralph Karels of  remarked that the designers took the second Super Sidekicks entry and implemented minimal improvements in various gameplay areas.

Stephan Girlich of  gave positive remarks to the audiovisual presentation, however he stated that Super Sidekicks 3 would prove uninteresting for players of previous Super Sidekicks titles but accessible for newcomers. Christophe Delpierre of  commented very positively about the graphics, animations, sound and playability. GamePros Scary Larry called it "a fun, fast-paced game that will appeal to fans and nonfans alike." Larry particularly praised the graphics and the "quick and intuitive" control interface. Micromanías F.D.L. reviewed the Neo Geo CD version criticized the long loading times but praised the addictive gameplay with multiple options and presentation. Next Generation reviewed the Neo-Geo version of the game, rating it two stars out of five, and stated that "If there were no other soccer games out there, this one would probably be considered great, but..." Javier Iturrioz of  praised the presentation, sound effects and responsive controls but remarked the music to be the most neglected aspect, stating that the game preserved elements from the Super Sidekicks 2 while improving the base gameplay.

Hobby Consolass Sonia Herranz praised the graphics, music, sound effects, playability and addictive gameplay. Hobby Hi-Techs Manuel del Campo noted that Super Sidekicks 3 did not introduced many additions compared to the second entry. The Electric Playgrounds Victor Lucas reviewed the Neo Geo CD version and gave positive remarks in regards to controls, visuals and sound design. Maximum gave the Neo Geo CD version two out of five stars, saying it suffers from "wooden" gameplay and inaccurate ball physics. Última Generacións J. Luis Sanz criticized the long loading times of the Neo Geo CD port. AllGames Kyle Knight felt that Super Sidekicks 3: The Next Glory felt like Super Sidekicks 2 gameplay-wise while altering certain aspects negatively.

Notes

References

External links 

 Super Sidekicks 3: The Next Glory at GameFAQs
 Super Sidekicks 3: The Next Glory at Giant Bomb
 Super Sidekicks 3: The Next Glory at Killer List of Videogames
 Super Sidekicks 3: The Next Glory at MobyGames

1995 video games
ACA Neo Geo games
Arcade video games
Association football video games
Multiplayer and single-player video games
Neo Geo games
Neo Geo CD games
Nintendo Switch games
PlayStation Network games
SNK games
Video games developed in Japan
Hamster Corporation games